Your First Impression is an NBC daytime game show which aired from January 2, 1962, to June 26, 1964. A panel of three celebrities tried to guess the identity of mystery guests from clues supplied by the host. Bill Leyden was the MC of the program, with Dennis James as a regular panelist or alternating host. Filmed in Burbank, California, Your First Impression was a Monty Hall-Art Stark Production. Hall was the series executive producer. The program aired at Noon Eastern time and followed another game, Concentration, then hosted by Hugh Downs.

Celebrities who appeared on the series included Pat Carroll, Bob Crane, Nina Foch, Ross Martin, Dean Miller, Leslie Nielsen, Inger Stevens, Elena Verdugo, Betty White, and Paul Winchell. Joan Crawford was a mystery guest. Richard Nixon appeared as a mystery guest after his losses to John F. Kennedy for President and Edmund G. (Pat) Brown for governor of California.  He got a laugh when he was asked to fill in the blank: "I wish that I __," and he answered, "had been a PT-boat captain."
(This was a reference to JFK's World War II heroics as captain of PT-109.)

References

External links 
 

NBC original programming
American panel games
1960s American game shows
1962 American television series debuts
1964 American television series endings
Television series by Stefan Hatos-Monty Hall Productions
English-language television shows